Kondapalli is a industrial and residential hub located in western part of Vijayawada in the Indian state of Andhra Pradesh. It is a municipality in Ibrahimpatnam mandal in Vijayawada revenue division of NTR district. It is closest to Ibrahimpatnam at a distance of 5 km. Dr Narla Tata Rao Thermal Power Station, one of the major Thermal Power stations of the state is located in between Ibrahimpatnam and Kondapalli. It is home for many industries like Andhra Pradesh Heavy Machinery & Engineering Limited (APHMEL), BPCL, HPCL, IOC, Reliance Industries, Lanco Infratech are located here. Kondapalli Toys are very famous in the state. Kondapalli Fort also known as Kondapalli Kota is located towards west of kondapalli. There is a proposal to merge this place into Vijayawada Municipal Corporation (VMC) to form a Greater Vijayawada Municipal Corporation.

Etymology 
In 18th century, Kondapalli was known with the name, Mustafanagar.

Culture 

The village is known for Kondapalli Toys (Kondapalli bommalu). The toys are chiselled from local light softwoods (Tella Poniki) and painted with vegetable dyes, and vibrant enamel colours. They are made by local wooden and lay artisans. The most popular toys include Dasavatarams (ten incarnations of Lord Vishnu) elephants with Ambari, palanquin-bearers carrying the bride and bridegroom, toddy tapper, set of village craftsmen, as well as various animals. The papier mache swinging doll is a favourite with many.

Fort

Flora and fauna 

It is home to several leopards, wild dogs, jackals, wild boar, and wolves with a varied topography. A Zoological park was also planned by the state government at the village.

Economy 

Kondapalli is an industrial suburb of Vijayawada. In addition to a 1760 MW Dr Narla Tata Rao Thermal Power Station (NTTPs) and 368.144 MW gas based Lanco power plant which is under expansion to 768.144 MW are located here. Andhra Pradesh Heavy Machinery & Engineering Limited (APHMEL) factory is present in Kondapalli. Kondapalli is hub for storage, bottling and transportation of petroleum products of all major companies. Major companies having a presence in Kondapalli include BPCL, GAIL, HPCL, IOC, Reliance Industries, and Lanco Infratech.

Transport 

Kondapalli railway station is located on Kazipet–Vijayawada section, administered under Vijayawada railway division of South Central Railway zone. NH 30 passes through the town, which connects Vijayawada with Uttarakhand. APSRTC operates city buses from Vijayawada to Kondapalli.

Education 
The primary and secondary school education is imparted by government, aided and private schools, under the School Education Department of the state. The medium of instruction followed by different schools are English and Telugu.

See also 
List of census towns in Andhra Pradesh

References

External links 

 Kondapalli toys

Neighbourhoods in Vijayawada
Census towns in Andhra Pradesh
Cities and towns in NTR district